Zajk is a village in Zala County, Hungary. It is known for its cheese.

References

External links 
 Street map 

Populated places in Zala County